Adán Jonathan Vergara Villagra (born 9 May 1981 in Iquique) is a Chilean football player and who currently plays for San Antonio Unido in Chile. He is an experienced and powerful central defender.

Club career 
Vergara started his career with Universidad de Chile in 1988. In 1993, he moved to Cobreloa where he had his professional debut in the first division in 1998. He played at Cobreloa, in the first division for six years, winning three Chilean Championships. He participated in five Copa Libertadores.

He first played outside Chile for Atlante. After this, he played the Campeonato Brasileiro de Futebol in 2005 with Vasco da Gama, in a team that also counted the national famous player, Romário, until end of season. He came back to Chile and played for Unión Española in 2006, he impressed with his abilities. 
On February, 2008, he signed a contract with FC Zürich, beginning a career in European football. In 2009, Adan went to loan by FC Lucerne, also in Switzerland, to strengthen their defense. In 2009, after 2 matches, he received a propose to play in Asia with Chinese club Dalian Shide  making it one of the Chilean players with more experience of the current.  In 2010, he signed with Universidad Católica, in Chile. In 2011, he go to Santiago Wanderers and 2012 playing in Mineros de Guayana, Venezuela.

International career
Vergara made his debut Chile National Team in 2001, in the 2001 FIFA World Youth Championship. He played many tournament in the National Team with U20 and U23 until 2004.

Coaching career
He graduated as a football manager in 2017. Since 2018 he has worked in the Cobreloa youth system, being also confirmed as coach of the women under-17 team in 2020.

Personal life
Vergara is married to Cherry de Paula, a Brazilian dancer who came to Chile along with his dancing group Porto Seguro at the beginning of the 2000s.

Honours

Club
Cobreloa
 Primera División de Chile (3): 2003 Apertura, 2003 Clausura, 2004 Clausura

Universidad Católica
 Primera División de Chile (1): 2010

References

External links 
 
 
 CSL official 

1981 births
Living people
People from Iquique
Chilean footballers
Chilean expatriate footballers
Chile under-20 international footballers
Association football defenders
Cobreloa footballers
Atlante F.C. footballers
CR Vasco da Gama players
Unión Española footballers
FC Zürich players
FC Luzern players
Dalian Shide F.C. players
Club Deportivo Universidad Católica footballers
Santiago Wanderers footballers
A.C.C.D. Mineros de Guayana players
Ñublense footballers
Deportes Temuco footballers
San Antonio Unido footballers
Chilean Primera División players
Ascenso MX players
Campeonato Brasileiro Série A players
Swiss Super League players
Chinese Super League players
Venezuelan Primera División players
Primera B de Chile players
Segunda División Profesional de Chile players
Expatriate footballers in Mexico
Expatriate footballers in Brazil
Expatriate footballers in China
Expatriate footballers in Switzerland
Expatriate footballers in Venezuela
Chilean expatriate sportspeople in Mexico
Chilean expatriate sportspeople in Brazil
Chilean expatriate sportspeople in China
Chilean expatriate sportspeople in Switzerland
Chilean expatriate sportspeople in Venezuela
Chilean football managers